The Tunisia men's national volleyball team, nicknamed Les Aigles de Carthage (The Eagles of Carthage or The Carthage Eagles), represents Tunisia in international volleyball competitions and friendly matches. The team is one of the leading nations in men's volleyball on the African continent, having won a medal in every continental championship they participated since 1967 (except for 2009). Eleven-time African Championship winners (1967, 1971, 1979, 1987, 1995, 1997, 1999, 2003, 2017, 2019, 2021), Tunisia have participated in seven Olympics, with a best finish of ninth at Los Angeles 1984.

Results
 Champions   Runners up   Third place   Fourth place

Red border color indicates tournament was held on home soil.

Olympic Games

World Championship

World Cup

World League

Nations League

Challenger Cup

African Championship
 Champions   Runners up   Third place   Fourth place

Red border color indicates tournament was held on home soil.

Arab Championship

Mediterranean Games

* Since 2001.

All-Africa Games

Pan Arab Games

Afro-Arab Volleyball Friendship Cup

Maghreb Volleyball Championship

Others
  Gold: 1 time: The Cup of the President of Kazakhstan :2012
  Gold: 1 time: Rashed International Tournament (Dubai) :2012
 11th: Cup of the five continents in Montevideo (Uruguay) :1969
 16th: Men's European Volleyball Championship in Prague (Czechoslovakia) :1958

U23 team

World Championship
 8th place: 2013
 9th place: 2015

African Championship
  Gold: 1 time: 2014

U21 team

World Championship
 15th place: 1985
 13th place: 1991
 5th place: 1993
 13th place: 1997
 9th place: 1999
 13th place: 2001
 13th place: 2003
 13th place: 2005
 14th place: 2009
 14th place: 2011
 13th place: 2013
 14th place: 2019

African Championship
  Gold: 10 times: 1984, 1990, 1992, 1996, 1998, 2000, 2008, 2010, 2013, 2018
  Silver: 5 times: 1994, 2002, 2004, 2006, 2022
  Bronze: 1 time: 1986

Arab Championship
  Gold: 1 time: 1989

U19 team

World Championship
 11th place: 1995
 9th place: 1997
 9th place: 1999
 8th place: 2001
 13th place: 2005
 14th place: 2007
 6th place: 2009
 16th place: 2011
 18th place: 2013
 20th place: 2017
 17th place: 2019

African Championship
  Gold: 8 times: 1994, 1997, 1998, 2000, 2006, 2008, 2010, 2016
  Silver: 4 times: 2002, 2004, 2013, 2015

Arab Championship
  Gold: 4 times: 1992, 1994, 1996, 2009
  Silver: 2 times: 2011, 2013
  Bronze: 1 time: 1998

Current roster
The following is the Tunisian roster in the 2022 World Championship.

Head coach:  Antonio Giacobbe

All Time Head coaches

See also
Tunisia women's national volleyball team
Tunisia men's national under-23 volleyball team
Tunisia men's national under-21 volleyball team
Tunisia men's national under-19 volleyball team
Tunisia women's national under-23 volleyball team
Tunisia women's national under-20 volleyball team
Tunisia women's national under-18 volleyball team
Tunisian Volleyball Federation

References

External links
Official website
FIVB profile

Volleyball
National men's volleyball teams
Volleyball in Tunisia
Men's sport in Tunisia